Leonhard Frank (4 September 1882 in Würzburg – 18 August 1961 in Munich) was a German expressionist writer. He studied painting and graphic art in Munich, and gained acclaim with his first novel The Robber Band (1914, tr. 1928). When a Berlin journalist celebrated in a famous café about news of the loss of the ship RMS Lusitania, torpedoed by a German submarine, Frank was upset – and slapped the man in his face. That is why he went into exile in Switzerland (1915–18), where he wrote a series of pacifist short-stories published under the title Man is Good. He returned to Germany, but after the Nazis gained power in 1933 Frank had to emigrate a second time. He lived in Switzerland again, moved to London, then Paris and finally fled under adventurous conditions to the United States in 1940, returning to Munich in 1950. His best-known novels were In the Last Coach (1925, tr. 1935) and Carl and Anna, which he dramatized in 1929. In 1947 MGM made a movie titled Desire Me out of this story.

Style and Motif
Leonhard Frank's novels and plays are known for their sensationalism. Frank's prose was compact and austere. This choice of style was used effectively to highlight his favorite theme—the damage inflicted by bourgeois society on the individual spirit.

Works
Frank had become a writer after working as a commercial artist. After he fled to Switzerland in 1914, he blossomed as a writer. It was in Switzerland that he wrote and published his first work The Robber Band. The book told the story of a group of rebellious young boys who harbor ambitions of dismantling their exploitative society and replacing it with an ideal one. But, as it often happens, the belligerent youth turn into docile adults, the good citizens of an unquestioning society. The story, like so many of his writings, presents the humorous facet of the middle class in a realistic manner. He published other books during his exile in Switzerland like The Cause of the Crime (1915), a scathing criticism of repressive educational systems, and Man Is Good (1917), a revolutionary denunciation of war.

Frank was a staunch believer in socialism. He regarded the overthrow of capitalism as paramount to the establishment of socialism. This desire was reflected in his novels A Middle-Class Man (1924) and in The Singers (1927). It was also during this period of semi-autobiographical writings that Frank produced what is regarded as his best work, the novel Carl and Anna (1926). The novel was a realistic masterpiece in which a soldier seduces his comrade's wife.

Success came with a price for Frank. His revolutionary writings did not go down well with the Nazis, who banned his books in 1933 and burned them. He did not get published in Germany again until in 1952, when his autobiographical novel Heart on the Left came out.

Filmography

Film adaptations
Homecoming, directed by Joe May (Germany, 1928, based on the novella Karl und Anna)
Die Räuberbande, directed by Hans Behrendt (Germany, 1928, based on the novel Die Räuberbande)
Desire Me (USA, 1947, based on the novella Karl und Anna)
Das Männerquartett, directed by Michael Verhoeven (West Germany, 1978, TV film, based on the novel Das Ochsenfurter Männerquartett)
Die Ursache, directed by Michael Verhoeven (West Germany, 1980, TV film, based on the novella Die Ursache)
The Woman and the Stranger, directed by Rainer Simon (East Germany, 1985, based on the novella Karl und Anna)

Screenwriter
Die Räuberbande, dir. Hans Behrendt, 1928)
The Murderer Dimitri Karamazov (dir. Fedor Ozep, 1931)
Hell on Earth (dir. Victor Trivas, 1931)
The Victor (dir. Hans Hinrich and Paul Martin, 1932)

References

External links
 
 

1882 births
1961 deaths
Commanders Crosses of the Order of Merit of the Federal Republic of Germany
German Expressionist writers
Jewish emigrants from Nazi Germany to the United States
German male writers
Kleist Prize winners
People from the Kingdom of Bavaria
Writers from Würzburg
Recipients of the National Prize of East Germany